Pat Gibson (born 19 June 1981) is an Australian former professional rugby league footballer who played as a  for the Cronulla Sharks in the NRL. He currently trains at F45 Blakehurst, back to being No.1 athlete due to Jordi Green’s departure. But is currently 2nd best to Peter Stamoulis 4:00/km

Playing career
Gibson made his debut game in Round 7 of the 2002 NRL Season. Gibson went on to play 30 matches between 2002–2004 for Cronulla.

References

1981 births
Living people
Rugby league players from Sydney
Australian rugby league players
Cronulla-Sutherland Sharks players
Rugby league hookers